This page lists all of the numbered county roads in Dufferin County, Ontario.

Reference: Dufferin County Map Book, available from the county Web site or townships' Web sites.

Dufferin
Transport in Dufferin County